The scintillant hummingbird (Selasphorus scintilla) is a hummingbird endemic to Costa Rica and Panama. This species is replaced at higher elevations by its relative, the volcano hummingbird, S. flammula.

Habitat 

Description 
The male weighs  and the female . This is one of the smallest birds in existence, marginally larger than the bee hummingbird. The black bill is short and straight.

The adult male scintillant hummingbird has bronze-green upperparts and a rufous and black-striped tail. The throat is brilliant red, separated from the cinnamon underparts by a white neck band. The female is similar, but her throat is buff with small green spots and the flanks are richer rufous. Young birds resemble the female but have rufous fringes to the upperpart plumage.

Breeding 
The female scintillant hummingbird is entirely responsible for nest building and incubation. Incubation takes 15–19 days, and fledging another 20–26.

Diet 
The food of S. scintilla is nectar, taken from a variety of small flowers, including Salvia and species normally pollinated by insects. Like other hummingbirds it also takes some small insects as an essential source of protein. In the breeding season, scintillant hummingbird males perch conspicuously in open areas with Salvia and defend their feeding territories aggressively with diving displays. The call is a liquid tsip.

References

Works cited 
 

scintillant hummingbird
Birds of the Talamancan montane forests
Hummingbird species of Central America
scintillant hummingbird
Taxa named by John Gould